"Let's Think About Living" is a song written by Boudleaux Bryant, and recorded by American country music artist Bob Luman. It was released in August 1960 as the second single and title track from his album Let's Think About Living. The song reached #9 on the Billboard Hot Country Singles & Tracks chart.

Background
The song is an open critique of the teenage tragedy song and gunfighter ballad genre of the time, humorously quipping that if Marty Robbins, Patti Page and the Everly Brothers actually died in the songs where they mention dying ("El Paso" and "Cathy's Clown" in the first and last respective cases) that the singer will soon be the last surviving musician in the industry. The singer suggests happier themes for songs in the future such as living, loving and dancing.

Charts

References

1960 singles
Bob Luman songs
Songs written by Felice and Boudleaux Bryant
1960 songs
Satirical songs
Songs about music
Warner Records singles